The Wog Boy is a 2000 Australian comedy film directed by Aleksi Vellis and starring Nick Giannopoulos, Vince Colosimo, Lucy Bell, Abi Tucker, Stephen Curry, Tony Nikolakopoulos and Derryn Hinch.

At the ARIA Music Awards of 2000 the soundtrack was nominated for Best Original Soundtrack Album.  It is the first part of Giannopoulous's eponymous Wog Boys Trilogy (aka "The Blue Valiant Trilogy") preceding Wog Boy 2: Kings of Mykonos, and the 2022 released final installment in the series, Wog Boys Forever.

Plot
Steve (Nick Giannopoulos) is a first-generation Greek Australian. Steve is unemployed, but manages to get by, helping out here and there. His pride and joy is his VF Valiant Pacer. Whilst helping out a compensation-oriented neighbour, Steve has a minor car accident involving the Minister for Employment, vampily played by Geraldine Turner. The net result of this encounter is twofold: Steve gets to meet Celia (Lucy Bell) whom he is instantly attracted to but who initially hates him, and Steve gets outed on national television by Derryn Hinch as the worst dole-bludger in Australia.

Steve manages to turn this around to his advantage, and becomes famous as The Wog Boy, spearheading a campaign to improve the employment status of the country. In the interim, he makes variable progress with Celia.

Car
Steve (Nick Giannopoulos) is seen driving a dark blue 1969 VF Valiant hardtop during the movie, which was allegedly given to him by his father.
During the film, it is said that the car's original engine was a 245-cubic-inch (4.0 L) 6-cylinder hemi, which was later replaced with an 8-cylinder engine.

The Australian Chrysler Valiant range of cars were often and sometimes still referred to as "Wog Chariots" or "The Greek Mercedes."

Soundtrack
A soundtrack was released, composed by Cezary Skubiszewski. It featured the single "Breakin'... There's No Stoppin' Us" by Ilanda, which was used to promote the film.

The track "Get Tzatziki With It" was also in the film's promotional campaign, and is played in the actual movie itself. It was written by John Von Ahlen, Jaime Jimenez and Nick Giannopoulos and recorded at Subterrane Recording Studio.

Songs
 "Pull Up to the Bumper" - Deni Hines
 "Breakin'... There's No Stopping Us" - Ilanda & Joanne
 "(She's got that) Vibe" - Redzone
 "Shine" - Vanessa Amorosi
 "Somebody Like You" - Jimmy Christo
 "Am I Sexy?" - The Lords of Acid
 "You Should Be Dancing" - Blockster
 "Born to Be Alive" - Patrick Hernandez
 "Love Lies Bleeding" - Sonic Animation
 "Bang-A-Boomerang" - The Mavis's
 "Love Theme From 'The Wog Boy' " - Cezary Skubiszewski
 "Get Tzatziki With It" - Planet J ft Nicky GiO
 "Pull Up to the Bumper (Club Mix)" - Deni Hines

Sequels
A sequel, Wog Boy 2: Kings of Mykonos, began production in October 2009 with Nick Giannopoulos and Vince Colosimo returning in the cast. The sequel was released in Australia on 20 May 2010.

In June 2021, a third film Wog Boys Forever was released in October 2022.

Box office
The Wog Boy grossed $11,449,799 at the box office in Australia.

Cast
 Nick Giannopoulos as Steve Karamitsis 
 Vince Colosimo as Frank 
 Lucy Bell as Celia O'Brien
 John Barresi as Domenic
 Stephen Curry as Nathan 
 Geraldine Turner as Raelene Beagle-Thorpe
 Abi Tucker as Annie O'Brien
 Tony Nikolakopoulos as Theo
 Derryn Hinch as Self
 Costas Kilias as Tony
 Vince D'Amico as Mario
 Kim Gyngell as The Supervisor 
 Trent Huen as Van
 Hung Le as Tran
 Peter Hosking as Bazza 
 Lucy Taylor as Shazza
 Vincent Gara as Young Steve
 Peter Stefanou as Fulvio 
 Bud Tingwell as Walker
 Robert Ratti as Andy 
 Robert Rabiah as Pietro 
 Dino Marnika as Reporter

References

External links 

The Wogboy at Oz Movies
The Wog Boy at the National Film and Sound Archive

2000 films
2000s English-language films
Australian comedy films
Films set in Melbourne
Films shot in Melbourne
2000 comedy films
Films set in Greece
Films shot in Greece